The Norwegian trench or Norwegian channel is an elongated depression in the sea floor off the southern coast of Norway.
It reaches from the Stad peninsula in Sogn og Fjordane in the northwest to the Oslofjord in the southeast.

It was formed during the last 1.1 million years by the effects of erosion associated with repeated ice stream activity.  The trench is not a subduction-related oceanic trench, where one tectonic plate is being forced under another. The Norwegian Trench was created by fluvial erosion processes during the later Tertiary age.  Pleistocene glaciers and ice sheets further deepened the trench. During the main glaciations, the Skagerrak Trough was the meeting point for ice from southeastern Norway, southern Sweden and parts of the Baltic causing a relatively fast-moving ice stream that passed south of the Norwegian coast and then turned north, eventually reaching deepwater
at about 62°N. The material carried by the ice stream was then deposited in the North Sea fan. Glacial erratics such as flint and rhomb porphyry, thought to originate from the Skagerrak and Oslo areas respectively, and deformed glacial tills found on the coast of Jæren provide the main onshore evidence for the Norwegian Channel Ice Stream.

The Norwegian current generally flows northeasterly along the Norwegian trench. The depth of the trench, along with density differences between Norwegian current water and the adjacent Atlantic Water, also result in large-scale eddies.  The Norwegian trench region in the Skagerrak is a biologically productive zone, as upwelling of North Atlantic water in the Skagerrak provides an input of nutrients.

After World War II , chemical weapons were dumped in the Norwegian Channel , when 36 ships were sunk there by allies with approval from the Norwegian authorities. 

The trench has provided an obstacle for oil and gas pipelines.

References

Landforms of Norway
Landforms of the North Sea
Oceanic trenches of the Atlantic Ocean
Skagerrak
Geology of the North Sea